Owch Bolagh (also Romanized as Owch Bolāgh, Owchbolāgh, and Ūch Bolāgh; also known as Ichūbulāq) is a village in Qaslan Rural District, Serishabad District, Qorveh County, Kurdistan Province, Iran. At the 2006 census, its population was 215, in 57 families. The village is populated by Kurds.

References 

Towns and villages in Qorveh County
Kurdish settlements in Kurdistan Province